Constitutional Court of the Republic of Lithuania (in ) is the constitutional court of the Republic of Lithuania, established by the Constitution of the Republic of Lithuania of 1992. It began the activities after the adoption of the Law of Constitutional Court of the Republic of Lithuania on 3 February 1993. Since its inception, the court has been located in Vilnius.

The main task of the court is judicial review. It may therefore declare the acts of the Seimas unconstitutional and thus render them ineffective. As such, it is somewhat similar to the Supreme Court of the United States. However, it differs from it and other supreme courts in that it is not part of the regular judicial system, but more a unique judicial branch. Most importantly, it does not serve as a regular court of appeals from lower courts or as a sort of "superappellate court" on any violation of national laws.

Its jurisdiction is focused on constitutional issues, the integrity of the Constitution. Moreover, it adjudicates on the conformance of the acts of the Government of the Republic of Lithuania to the laws, compliance with the Constitution of international agreements, as well as their ratification, and takes a final decision on voting infringements.

Activities
The Court has played a substantial role in the development of the Lithuanian legal system, declaring a number of national laws unconstitutional. 
On 31 March 2004, it issued a ruling acknowledging the breach of the oath of office by the President Rolandas Paksas. He was removed from office by Seimas following the impeachment on 6 April 2004; this has been the first successful case of impeachment of the head of state in the history of Europe.  The ruling interpreted the Constitution as precluding a person, who was pleaded guilty for the breach of oath, from assuming any future position in public service, which requires taking an oath.

On 9 December 1998, the Constitutional Court declared that article 105 of the criminal code of the Republic of Lithuania, which established the death penalty, violated several articles of the Constitution. This ruling was a big step in humanizing the punishment system.

Composition
The Court comprises nine justices, appointed by the Seimas, for a nine-year non-renewable term of office. Only Lithuanian citizens of an impeccable reputation, who are trained in law, and who have served for at least 10 years in the legal profession, or in an area of legal education are eligible for appointment. Usually, notable legal scholars and highly experienced judges qualify for the position. The court is renewed by a third every three years. The candidates are nominated by the Chairman of the Seimas, the President of Lithuania and the President of the Supreme Court of the Republic of Lithuania, the Seimas then decides on appointing them. The Seimas appoints the President of the Court from among the justices upon the nomination by the President of the state.

Members

Current members

Historical composition
1993–1996

Juozas Žilys (President)
Algirdas Gailiūnas
Kęstutis Lapinskas
Zigmas Levickis
Vladas Pavilonis († 2003)
Pranas Vytautas Rasimavičius († 2002)
Teodora Staugaitienė
Stasys Stačiokas
Stasys Šedbaras.

1996–1999

Juozas Žilys (President)
 Egidijus Jarašiūnas
Kęstutis Lapinskas
Zigmas Levickis
Augustinas Normantas
Vladas Pavilonis (†2003)
Jonas Prapiestis
Pranas Vytautas Rasimavičius (†2002)
Teodora Staugaitienė

1999–2002

Vladas Pavilonis (President) (†2003)
Egidijus Jarašiūnas
Egidijus Kūris
Zigmas Levickis
Augustinas Normantas
 Jonas Prapiestis
Vytautas Sinkevičius
Stasys Stačiokas
Teodora Staugaitienė

2002–2005

 Egidijus Kūris (President)
Egidijus Jarašiūnas
Augustinas Normantas
Armanas Abramavičius
Kęstutis Lapinskas
Zenonas Namavičius
Jonas Prapiestis
Vytautas Sinkevičius
Stasys Stačiokas

2005-2008

Egidijus Kūris (President)
Vytautas Sinkevičius
Stasys Stačiokas
Kęstutis Lapinskas
Armanas Abramavičius
Zenonas Namavičius
Romualdas Kęstutis Urbaitis
Toma Birmontienė
Ramutė Ruškytė

2008-2011

Kęstutis Lapinskas (President)
Armanas Abramavičius
Zenonas Namavičius
Romualdas Kęstutis Urbaitis
Toma Birmontienė
Ramutė Ruškytė
Pranas Kuconis
Egidijus Šileikis
Algirdas Taminskas

2011-2014

Romualdas Kęstutis Urbaitis (President)
Toma Birmontienė
Ramutė Ruškytė
Pranas Kuconis
Egidijus Šileikis
Algirdas Taminskas
Dainius Žalimas
Egidijus Bieliūnas
Gediminas Mesonis 

2014-2017

Dainius Žalimas (President)
Pranas Kuconis
Egidijus Šileikis
Algirdas Taminskas
Gediminas Mesonis
Elvyra Baltutytė
Vytas Milius
Vytautas Greičius
Danutė Jočienė 

2017-2020

Dainius Žalimas (President)
Gediminas Mesonis
Elvyra Baltutytė
Vytas Milius
Vytautas Greičius
Danutė Jočienė 
Gintaras Goda
Daiva Petrylaitė
Janina Stripeikienė

2020-2023 (current)

Danutė Jočienė (President)
Elvyra Baltutytė
Vytautas Greičius
Gintaras Goda
Daiva Petrylaitė
Janina Stripeikienė
Giedrė Lastauskienė
Algis Norkūnas
Vytautas Mizaras

See also
 Judiciary
 Rule of law
 Rule According to Higher Law

References

External links
 

1993 establishments in Lithuania
Lithuanian constitutional law
Judiciary of Lithuania
Lithuania
Courts and tribunals established in 1993